WASP-66, also known as TYC 7193-1804-1, is an F-type star in the constellation Antlia.

WASP-66 has a classification of F4.5 V, which states that it is an ordinary F-type main sequence star that is fusing hydrogen at its core. At present it has 130% the mass of the Sun and 175 the radius of the Sun. The star is younger than Sun at  billion years, and may be either metal-poor or similar to Sun in concentration of heavy elements. Currently it is spinning moderately with a projected rotational velocity of 13.4 km/s.

Planetary system
In 2012, a superjovian planet around WASP-66 was discovered. WASP-66b has a mass that is about 2.3 times that of Jupiter. It takes just over 4 days to complete an orbit around its star, making it a typical hot Jupiter. The planet was discovered by the transit method – this is when a planet passes in front of a star, temporarily blocking some of the star's light.

The planetary orbit is well aligned with the equatorial plane of the star, the misalignment angle being equal to −4°.

References

Antlia
F-type main-sequence stars
Planetary systems with one confirmed planet
Planetary transit variables
J10325399-3459234